Indra Vidyavachaspati (1889-1960) was an Indian politician. He was a Member of Parliament, representing Uttar Pradesh in the Rajya Sabha the upper house of India's Parliament as a member of the Indian National Congress

References

Rajya Sabha members from Uttar Pradesh
Indian National Congress politicians
1889 births
1960 deaths
Indian National Congress politicians from Uttar Pradesh